Armando Picchi (20 June 1935 – 27 May 1971) was an Italian football player and coach. Regularly positioned as a libero, he captained the Internazionale side known as "La Grande Inter".

Club career

Early career
Born in Livorno, Picchi started his career by playing for A.S. Livorno Calcio. In 1959 he moved to SPAL, before later at the peak of his time, and most of his career, at Milanese powerhouse F.C. Internazionale Milano.

Captain of Grande Inter

A versatile defender, Picchi started to play in Internazionale as a right back, a role he previously held at SPAL. During the course of 1961–62 season, the legendary Grande Inter coach Helenio Herrera experimented by placing him as a libero. The new position was successful; he became an important figure in the team's strong defence, and indirectly set examples for teammates Tarcisio Burgnich and Giacinto Facchetti with his leadership. During that time, Internazionale was still captained by Bruno Bolchi.

When Bolchi moved to Verona, Picchi was then selected as team captain. It was in his captaincy that Internazionale evolved into the era famously known as Grande Inter, when they won three scudetti, two European Champions Cups and two Intercontinental Cups in the 1960s.

Later career
After his time at Inter, he played for two seasons at Varese before retiring in 1969, at the age of 34.

International career
He made his debut for Italy several months after becoming Intercontinental champion with Internazionale, in a 6–1 victory over Finland in November 1964. However, Italy coach at that time, Edmondo Fabbri, deemed him unsuitable for the team's scheme, as he felt he was too defensive minded, and subsequently left him out of the squad for 1966 World Cup in England.

Under the management of Ferruccio Valcareggi, he was regularly called for the qualifying matches of Euro 1968. Yet a fractured pelvis injury in a match against Bulgaria in April 1968, ruled him out of the competition, which concluded his last match with the Azzurri, totalling 12 international appearances.

Style of play

A quick, versatile, and tenacious defender, Picchi began his career playing as a forward or as a central defensive midfielder, before being moved to right back, where he excelled, but later came into his own in the libero role. Picchi was primarily an old-fashioned sweeper, who was mainly known for his defensive skills, strong physique, and ability to win back, intercept and clear loose balls as a last man, while he was not particularly good in the air, due to his small stature; despite his more traditional, defensive-minded interpretation of the role, he was, however, also occasionally capable of getting forward, and of carrying the ball out into midfield, or starting plays from the back-line, due to his good technique and ability to read the game. Regarded as one of Italy's greatest defenders, and as one of the best sweepers of his generation, he was highly regarded for his tactical intelligence as well as vocal leadership on the pitch, and was known for his ability to organise the back-line and motivate his teammates.

Coaching career and death

After his playing career was over, Picchi pursued a coaching career in 1969; he went on to coach Varese, Livorno, and then Juventus, until 16 February 1971, when he was hospitalised because of cancer, which ended his coaching career prematurely. He died three months later, at the age of 35, due a tumour in his sixth left rib.

Legacy
After his death in 1971, a memorial tournament, Memorial Armando Picchi, was played in his honour. On 21 October of the same year, the football club Armando Picchi Calcio was founded in his memory.

As of 1990, the football stadium of Livorno, his hometown club, is named after him.

Honours
Inter Milan
 Serie A: 1962–63, 1964–65, 1965–66
 European Cup: 1963–64, 1964–65
 Intercontinental Cup: 1964, 1965

Individual
Italian Football Hall of Fame: 2021

References

External links
Inter Profile 
FIGC Profile 

1935 births
1971 deaths
Sportspeople from Livorno
Italian footballers
Italy international footballers
Association football sweepers
S.P.A.L. players
Inter Milan players
Serie A players
Juventus F.C. managers
Serie A managers
S.S.D. Varese Calcio players
Italian football managers
U.S. Livorno 1915 players
U.S. Livorno 1915 managers
UEFA Champions League winning players
Deaths from cancer in Liguria
Footballers from Tuscany